Green Township is one of the ten townships of Clark County, Ohio, United States. The 2010 census reported 2,798 people living in the township, 2,750 of whom lived in the unincorporated portions of the township.

Geography
Located in the southern part of the county, it borders the following townships:
Springfield Township - north
Harmony Township - northeast corner
Madison Township - east
Cedarville Township, Greene County - southeast
Miami Township, Greene County - southwest
Mad River Township - west

Part of the village of Clifton is located in the southern part of the township.

Name and history
Green Township was organized in 1818. It takes its name from Greene County, Ohio.

It is one of sixteen Green Townships statewide.

Government
The township is governed by a three-member board of trustees, who are elected in November of odd-numbered years to a four-year term beginning on the following January 1. Two are elected in the year after the presidential election and one is elected in the year before it. There is also an elected township fiscal officer, who serves a four-year term beginning on April 1 of the year after the election, which is held in November of the year before the presidential election. Vacancies in the fiscal officership or on the board of trustees are filled by the remaining trustees.

References

External links
County website

Townships in Clark County, Ohio
1818 establishments in Ohio
Populated places established in 1818
Townships in Ohio